Padappakara is a village in the Kollam district of Kerala, India. The name "Padappakara" derives from the name "Pada-Kappal-Kara", which means "naval ship yard". Between 1400 AD to 1850 AD this place was used as a safe harbour during the monsoon by the wooden merchant and naval ships. It includes areas like Kochupoika, Nellimukku, Kaithamunampu, Thekkeyattam, Kuthiramunambu, Thenguvila, N.S Nagar
and Aanappara, Pulliakkody, Aasante poika, Kanmukhathu Kody, Anchumoolapoika, Chanakkody, Chonkil, Valathil, Poolakkody, and Valyandakkal. Padappakkara is the birthplace of Sri Manappoikayil Thampi Sir, Shri Antony Neeklos, Shri V.B. Lawarance,  etc. etc. all are now in etternal peace.  Mr. A.P. Francis - a stage artist, Mr.Babu Augustine - Author of Novel book namely Padakkapal, Mr. Francis - a Majistrate, etc. etc. are the legends here now.

History 

The Book namely "Padakkappal" written by the great writer Mr.Babu Augustine,  elaborating all History and Unique Myth of Padappakara.  As written in "Padakkappal" this land was given Gift to a magician by Travancore King due to his great work to save the kingdom.  The author of Malayalam Novel, Mr. Babu Augustine clearly mentioned in the said book that he got many of the details about Padappakara from Kadayaattu Veedu on his research for completing the Malayalam Novel Book Padakkappal on the basis of the myth.  Padappakkara was largely an unpopulated area till the 1880s. Mass migration of people started in late 1950s. Many areas in Padappakkara now resemble a suburb. Initial immigrants to Padappakara were farmers, labours of building & sand and fishermen from neighboring areas like Koduvila, Kallada, Sinkarapally, Mantrothuruth, Pattakadavu, Kumbalam, Chemmakadu, Vellimon, Perayam, Mulavana, Kanjirode etc. Comparatively low land prices was the driving factor behind the immigration. Tese immigration causes several struggles among the families up to 1986. After that, these converted into political struggle up to 2005. As per 1981 senses almost people of Padappakara
obtained minimum graduates, most of the girls were post- graduates. This area donated to'Kadayattu Unnithan' by Veluthambi Thelava' without land tax.

Etymology
This place naval base ship-yard from before Christ ,the shipyard functioned on southern side of Padappakara were found channakallu. Hence these place is also known as Chana-Kodi, now  Sundara-Theeram resort is  functioning on opposite side of Palm-legoon resort boating facilities also available in between the resort. These southern side of Padakappal-kkara have largest depth in the Ashtamudi lake made by natural ship-yard. Arabians, finishers and Yehudi were made large number of ship from Padappakara towards France, Italy, Germany and England.

Naval Base ship were landed at 'Pada-Poika' in between Nellimukkam-Parapuram and Kuthiramunambu Padappamatel- Anhumalapoika for fighting in first phase against enemy towards Neendakara and Thankassery. Padappakara is the East highest place in the Ashtamudi lake.

Amenities 
Hospital
GHD Padappakara, a primary health clinic run by government.

Education 
There are three schools.St. Joseph's High School, run by the Catholic Church is the main school in padappakara. and  there is a Govt LP school in Padappakara (NS nagar).There is also an English medium primary school run by the Congregation of Teresian Carmelites.

Economy 
There are a lot of people working in government service. Remittance from family members working abroad, marginal farming and fishing are the main pillars of the economy. Tourism industry is in a nascent stage, with couple of Lake resorts.

Religion
Almost all residents are Roman Catholics. In 1963 Padappakara became a parish under Quilon Diocese as a spin-off from Kumbalam parish. St. Joseph's Church blessed on 10 June 1973 is the parish church. and there are 2 chapal in Padappakara, St. Sebastion Chapel in NS Nagar and St. Jude Chapel in Kuthiramunabhu

Clubs 
A number of youth clubs are located in Padappakara including century padappakkara ,Costarica Padappakara, Sincere Padappakara, Yuvashakti Challengers Kuthiramunambu and Sariga N.S. Nagar and conducts its annual celebrations.

References 

Villages in Kollam district